Wilbert may refer to:

Wilbert, Minnesota, U.S., unincorporated community
Wilbert, Archbishop of Cologne (died 889)
 Wilbert or Wigberht (8th–9th century), Bishop of Sherborne

Given name
Wilbert Awdry (1911– 1997), English clergyman, railway enthusiast, and children's author
Wilbert Harrison (1929–1994), American singer and songwriter
Wilbert Johnson or Wil Johnson (born 1965), English actor
Wilbert Keon (1935–2019), Canadian physician
Wilbert J. McKeachie (1921–2019), American psychologist
Wilbert Montgomery (born 1954), American football player
Wilbert Olinde (born 1955), American-German basketball player
Wilbert Suvrijn (born 1962), Dutch international footballer

Fictional characters
Wilbert the Forest Engine, The Railway Series character with self-titled book

See also
Wilber (disambiguation)

English masculine given names